The 1927–28 New York Americans season was the American's third season of play. The team finished in last place in the Canadian Division and did not qualify for the playoffs.

Offseason

Regular season

Final standings

Record vs. opponents

Game log

Player stats

Regular season
Scoring

Goaltending

Awards and records

Transactions

Playoffs
They didn't qualify for the playoffs

See also
1927–28 NHL season

References

New York
New York
New York Americans seasons
New York Amer
New York Amer
1920s in Manhattan
Madison Square Garden